The Eighth Amendment of the Constitution Act 1983 was an amendment to the Constitution of Ireland which inserted a subsection recognising the equal right to life of the pregnant woman and the unborn. Abortion had been subject to criminal penalty in Ireland since at least 1861; the amendment ensured that legislation or judicial interpretation would be restricted to allowing abortion in circumstances where the life of a pregnant woman was at risk. It was approved by referendum on 7 September 1983 and signed into law on 7 October 1983. In 2018, it was repealed by referendum.

The amendment was adopted during the Fine Gael–Labour Party coalition government led by Garret FitzGerald, but was drafted and first suggested by the previous Fianna Fáil government of Charles Haughey. The amendment was supported by Fianna Fáil and some of Fine Gael, and was opposed by the political left. Most of those opposed to the amendment insisted that they were not in favour of legalising abortion. The Catholic hierarchy and many lay Catholics supported the amendment, but it was opposed by the authorities of other mainstream churches. After a bitter referendum campaign, the amendment was passed by 67% voting in favour to 33% voting against.

In 2018, a referendum was passed, known as the Thirty-sixth Amendment of the Constitution of Ireland, which repealed the Eighth Amendment.

Changes to the text
The Amendment inserted a new sub-section after section 3 of Article 40. The resulting Article 40.3.3º read:

Background
As per sections 58 and 59 of the Offences against the Person Act 1861, abortion was already illegal in Ireland. However, anti-abortion campaigners feared the possibility of a judicial ruling in favour of allowing abortion. In McGee v. Attorney General (1973), the Supreme Court of Ireland had ruled against provisions of the Criminal Law Amendment Act 1935 prohibiting the sale and importation of contraception on the grounds that the reference in Article 41 to the "imprescriptable rights, antecedent and superior to all positive law" of the family conferred upon spouses a broad right to privacy in marital affairs.

The Pro-Life Amendment Campaign (PLAC) was founded in 1981 to campaign against a ruling in Ireland similar to Roe v. Wade. Prior to the 1981 general election, PLAC lobbied the major Irish political parties – Fianna Fáil, Fine Gael and the Labour Party – to urge the introduction of a Bill to allow the amendment to the constitution to prevent the Irish Supreme Court so interpreting the constitution as giving a right to abortion. The leaders of the three parties – respectively Charles Haughey, Garret FitzGerald and Frank Cluskey – agreed although there was little consultation with any of their parties' ordinary members. All three parties were in government over the following eighteen months, but it was only in late 1982, just before the collapse of a Fianna Fáil minority government, that a proposed wording for the amendment was produced.

Oireachtas debate
The Eighth Amendment of the Constitution Bill 1982 was introduced on 2 November 1982 by Minister for Health Michael Woods. The bill introduced by the Fianna Fáil minority government proposed to add Article 40.3.3º to the Constitution, with the wording shown above.

On 4 November, the Fianna Fáil government led by Charles Haughey as Taoiseach lost a motion of confidence in the Dáil, leading to the November 1982 general election. After the election, a coalition government of Fine Gael and the Labour Party was formed, with Garret FitzGerald as Taoiseach. Minister for Health Barry Desmond declined to reintroduce the amendment; instead, it was Minister for Justice Michael Noonan who on 2 February moved to restore the Eighth Amendment to the Order Paper.

Attorney General Peter Sutherland advised that the wording as proposed was dangerously flawed. Speaking against the original wording during the Dáil debate Alan Shatter argued:

To remedy the perceived weaknesses in the original wording of the amendment bill, the government proposed an amendment to the bill during the committee stage with the following alternative wording:

This alternative wording was criticised by the opposition for not being "pro-life". Speaking against the alternative wording Michael Woods said:

A number of backbench Fine Gael TDs supported the Fianna Fáil wording, and voted against the government amendment, which was defeated by 87 to 65. The majority of Fine Gael TDs then abstained in subsequent votes. The original wording proposed by Fianna Fáil was then approved by 85 votes to 11 votes in the Dáil, and by 14 votes to 6 in the Seanad, and put to a referendum.

Referendum campaign
The referendum was supported by PLAC, Fianna Fáil, some members of Fine Gael, the Catholic hierarchy, and opposed by various groups under the umbrella name of the Anti-Amendment Campaign (AAC), including Labour senator (and future President of Ireland) Mary Robinson, feminist campaigners, and trade unions. Few in Fine Gael or Labour campaigned against the referendum, and before the vote, Garret FitzGerald declared that he would vote against it. Sinn Féin and the Workers' Party opposed the amendment, and the Irish Council of Churches (representing the main Protestant churches) campaigned against it.

Anti-Amendment campaigners warned the vague nature of the amendment, the sectarian nature of it, the possible risk to the health treatment to pregnant women, and to the possible legal consequences for contraception, which the Pro-Life Amendment Campaign denied.

The Amendment passed on 7 September 1983 endorsed by 67% of those who voted.

Result

Judicial interpretation
In a number of cases, the Supreme Court had held that this provision of the Constitution prohibited information within the state on the availability of abortion services outside of the state. In AG (SPUC) v Open Door Counselling Ltd. (1988), the courts injunction restraining two counseling agencies from assisting women to travel abroad to obtain abortions or informing them of the methods of communications with such clinics, and in SPUC v Grogan (1989), the courts granted an injunction restraining three students' unions from distributing information in relation to abortion available outside the state. These rulings were overturned by the Thirteenth Amendment and Fourteenth Amendment in 1992, which explicitly gave people the right to travel abroad for an abortion, and to receive information in Ireland about abortion available abroad.

In Attorney General v. X (the X Case) in early 1992, the High Court granted an injunction to the Attorney General restraining a fourteen-year-old girl who had been raped from obtaining an abortion in England. On appeal, Supreme Court found that as the girl had shown a risk of suicide, to safeguard "the equal right to life of the mother" in Article 40.3.3º, abortion was permissible in this instance.

The Pro Life Campaign, a successor to PLAC, accused the Supreme Court of misinterpreting both the law and the will of the people. The Government and former Attorney-General Peter Sutherland dismissed such claims, arguing that, as they had claimed in 1983, the 'Pro-Life Amendment' was so poorly worded and ambiguous that it could facilitate either pro-abortion rights or anti-abortion interpretations in different circumstances.  The Amendment was not reinterpreted by the Supreme Court on the grounds originally voiced by Peter Sutherland that it would lead to abortion prior to viability or kill women by refusing standard treatments for ectopic pregnancies, cancerous wombs, etc. There was no medical evidence called during the X case hearings.

In PP v. HSE (2014), the High Court held that the constitution did not require a woman who was medically brain dead to be kept on life support to keep the foetus within her alive, because the chance of the foetus being born alive were "virtually non-existent". It is unclear how the case would have been decided if the pregnancy was further along.

In HSE v. B. (2016), the High Court declined to grant an order sought by the Health Service Executive permitting it to carry out a caesarean section against the will of a pregnant mother.

In an application for leave seeking judicial review of an order for deportation of a Nigerian man, Humphreys J held for the High Court in August 2016 that leave should be granted, in part on the family rights of the unborn child at the time of the deportation. The state appealed this decision. On 7 March 2018, the Supreme Court upheld the High Court and dismissed the state's appeal in a unanimous decision that the Minister is obliged to take into account the fact of pregnancy; however, it reversed other sections of the High Court and ruled the Minister is accordingly not obliged to treat the unborn as having constitutional rights other than the rights contained in Article 40.3.3º.

Later referendums
Three referendums were held in November 1992. The Twelfth Amendment of the Constitution Bill, 1992 sought to exclude "a risk of self-destruction" as grounds for abortion, to overturn the central element of the decision in the X Case. This was rejected by 65% to 35%. The Thirteenth Amendment, permitting travel to obtain abortion in another jurisdiction, was approved by 62% to 38%. The Fourteenth Amendment, permitting information about services in other countries, was approved by 60% to 40%.

After these amendments, which became law on 23 December 1992, Article 40.3.3º read,

A further referendum which proposed to insert legislation into the Constitution which would permit abortion where there was a threat to life but not where there was a risk of suicide, the Twenty-fifth Amendment of the Constitution Bill 2001, was narrowly defeated by 50.4% to 49.6%.

Maastricht protocol
The Treaty on European Union, or the Maastricht Treaty, was signed on 7 February 1992. To assuage fears that free movement of services would lead to access in Ireland to abortion services, the government secured a protocol to the Treaty protecting the constitutional provision. The Maastricht Treaty was approved in a referendum in June 1992 by 69% to 31%. Following amendments to the Treaty on European Union affected by the Lisbon Treaty in 2009, this provision now reads:

Legislation
The Protection of Life During Pregnancy Act 2013 replaced the abortion offences in the Offences against the Person Act 1861 and made statutory provision for the limited right to abortion established by the X Case. It replaced the offence of "unlawfully procuring a miscarriage" punishable to life imprisonment with the offence of "destruction of unborn human life", punishable by up to 14 years' imprisonment.

Campaign to Repeal the Eighth Amendment

The Campaign to Repeal the Eighth Amendment has its roots in the unsuccessful Anti-Amendment Campaign in 1983. There was a campaign to Repeal the Eight Amendment after the X Case in 1992, and the three abortion referendums which followed it (the 12th, 13th and 14th). The campaign lay dormant for more than 20 years until the death of Savita Halappanavar in 2012. The Abortion Rights Campaign was founded in 2012. The #RepealThe8th hashtag was started on Twitter in 2012. The use of a social media to campaign to #RepealThe8th was an effective way to gain momentum leading up to the 2018 referendum. Twitter is recognised as 'one of the primary tools' for social justice, and in Ireland's case, allowed women to connect for collaborative social change despite the physical distance between them.

This campaign is led by a coalition of pro-abortion rights groups, including the Association for Improvements in Maternity Services (AIMS) Ireland, the Coalition to Repeal the Eighth, the Abortion Rights Campaign, Doctors for Choice, the Termination for Medical Reasons group, etc., and has support from a number of legal academics and members of the medical profession, including the Institute of Obstetricians and Gynaecologists. In the run up to the 2016 general election, a number of parties committed to a referendum to repeal the Eighth Amendment (Labour, Green Party, Social Democrats, Sinn Féin and Workers' Party) as well as a group of feminist law academics published model legislation to show what a post-Eighth Amendment abortion law could look like. In June 2016, Minister for Health Simon Harris stated his support for a referendum on repealing the 8th.

On 27 July 2016, the government appointed Supreme Court judge Mary Laffoy as chair of a Citizens' Assembly to consider a number of topics, including the Eighth Amendment. The Assembly recommended a referendum to remove and replace the 8th Amendment. In September 2017, the Oireachtas Committee on the 8th Amendment began its work considering how to give effect to this recommendation.

The 5th Annual March for Choice, organised by the Abortion Rights Campaign, took place in Dublin on Saturday 24 September 2016 marking the Global Day of Action for Access to Safe and Legal Abortion. The theme of the rally was Rise and Repeal. The attendance was estimated to be around 20,000. The 2017 March for Choice attracted 40,000 marchers, according to organisers.

On Saturday 21 July 2017, the Rally for Life was organised by prominent anti-abortion groups including the Life Institute, Youth Defence, and the Northern Ireland group Precious Life, in opposition to the campaign. A march held on 10 March 2018 at Merrion Square was estimated to have had a turnout of 15,000, although organisers claim up to 100,000 attended.

On 14 June 2017, the Taoiseach Leo Varadkar announced his government's intention to bring forward legislation to facilitate the holding of a referendum on abortion in 2018. On 9 March 2018, debate began in the Dáil on the Thirty-sixth Amendment of the Constitution Bill 2018, which would replace the current provisions on Article 40.3.3º with the following clause:

On 25 May 2018, the Irish people voted by 66.4% to remove the Eighth Amendment, choosing to replace it with the above text as a part of the Thirty-sixth Amendment to the Constitution, permitting the Oireachtas (parliament) to legislate for the regulation of termination of pregnancy. When it was signed in to law by the President of Ireland, it superseded the 8th, 13th and 14th amendments. 39 of the 40 Constituencies voted in favour, the constituency of Donegal being the only one to vote against.

See also
 Abortion in the Republic of Ireland
 Contraception in the Republic of Ireland
 A, B and C v Ireland (2010), a case decided by the European Court of Human Rights
 Attorney General v. X (1992), a decision of the Supreme Court of Ireland
 Constitution of Ireland
 Foetal rights
 Thirty-sixth Amendment of the Constitution of Ireland

References
Fiona de Londras, Mairead Enright Repealing the 8th: Reforming Abortion Law in Ireland

Oireachtas debates

Notes

External links
 Eighth Amendment of the Constitution Act, 1983
 Full text of the Constitution of Ireland

1983 in Irish law
1983 in Irish politics
1983 referendums
08
08
08
Abortion in the Republic of Ireland
08
September 1983 events in Europe
1983 in women's history
Amendment, 08